Nuvvu Leka Nenu Lenu (English: Without You, I Am Not There) is a 2002 Indian Telugu-language romantic comedy film, starring Tarun, Aarti Agarwal, Laya, Sarath Babu, Chandra Mohan, and Radha Kumari. This film was released on 14 January 2002 with positive reviews and became a blockbuster.

Cast

 Tarun as Radha Krishna
 Aarthi Agarwal as Krishna Veni
 Laya as Neerja
 Kiran Rathod as Anjali
 Brahmanandam as Shastri
 Sunil as Karri Seenu
 Chandra Mohan as Siva Prasad, Krishna's father
 Sarath Babu as Panduranga Rao, Radha's father
 Ahuti Prasad as Ram Mohan
 K. Viswanath as Ramachandraiah
 MS Narayana as Doctor
 Paruchuri Venkateswara Rao as Kodi Peddaiah
 Gundu Hanumantha Rao as Hanumantha Shastri
 Pragathi as Krishna's mother
 Sudha as Radha's mother
 Chittajalu Lakshmipati as Lakshmipati
 Raghunatha Reddy
 Subbaraya Sharma as Manager Murthy
 Kadambari Kiran as Bus conductor
 Chitram Seenu as Guava seller

Soundtrack 
Edo Edo - Usha

Ela Ela - Usha

Nindu Godari Kada - R. P. Patnaik, Kousalya

Nuvvante Naakistam - R. P. Patnaik

References

External links
 

2000s Telugu-language films
Suresh Productions films
2000 romantic comedy-drama films
Films scored by R. P. Patnaik